James King King (6 November 1806 – 17 June 1881) was a British Conservative Party politician.

King King was the eldest son of James Simpkinson King (1767–1842) and Emma, daughter of Edward Vaux. He studied at Balliol College, Oxford, receiving a Bachelor of Arts in 1829. In 1835, he married Mary Cochrane Mackenzie, daughter of Kenneth Francis Mackenzie. She was a sister of Colin MacKenzie. Together they had three sons and seven daughters.

He was elected MP for Herefordshire in 1852 and held the seat until 1868.

King King was also a Justice of the Peace, a Deputy Lieutenant and, in 1845, High Sheriff of Herefordshire. His family seat was Stanton Park at Staunton on Arrow, where he was a major landowner and lord of the manor.

References

External links
 

Conservative Party (UK) MPs for English constituencies
Deputy Lieutenants of Herefordshire
1806 births
1881 deaths
UK MPs 1852–1857
UK MPs 1857–1859
UK MPs 1859–1865
UK MPs 1865–1868
High Sheriffs of Herefordshire